The Communist Party of Bangladesh is a Marxist–Leninist communist party in Bangladesh.

History 
After the partitioning of India in 1947, during the 2nd Congress of the Communist Party of India in Calcutta, the delegates coming from regions within the newly founded state of Pakistan (which included what now constitutes Bangladesh) met on March 6, 1948 in a separate session and decided to form the Communist Party of Pakistan. Nepal Nag became the General Secretary of the party.

The main strength and activity of the newly constituted Party was in the province of East Pakistan (what is now Bangladesh). This eastern province was geographically separated from the western province by almost 2,000 km of Indian territory. Because of this wide geographical separation along with persecution by Pakistan government and uneven development of democratic movement in the two parts of Pakistan, the communists of East Pakistan felt the need to have an independent centre for further advancing their activities. The 4th Conference of the East Pakistan Provincial Committee of the Party, which met clandestinely in 1968, declared itself to be the 1st Congress of the Communist Party of East Pakistan and elected a Central Committee for the Party. With the emergence of Bangladesh as an independent state in 1971, this Party took its present name of Communist Party of Bangladesh.

The Party played a vital role in the 1969 uprising and also during the nationwide upheaval that followed it including the non co-operation movement of 1971. The CPB also actively participated in the nine months long armed struggle for independence of Bangladesh in 1971. A ‘Special Guerilla Force’ under the direct command of CPB-NAP-BSU fought against the Pakistani army. Communists also took part in the other segments of the armed resistance fighters including the Mukti Bahini and the new Bangladesh Army. Moni Singh, the ex-President of CPB, was elected a member of the Advisory Council of the Provisional Government of Bangladesh.

Independent Bangladesh
The independence of Bangladesh in 1971 opened up a new chapter in the history of the Communist Party of Bangladesh. The Party began to work legally and openly. The Party formed a Trade Union Centre with a view to mobilizing trade union organizations and movements on revolutionary lines. A Gana Oikya Jote was formed on 14 October 1973 consisting of the Bangladesh Awami League, Communist Party and National Awami Party (Muzaffar) with a view to prepare ground for establishing socialism in the country, and a Jote Committee was constituted consisting of 19 members with three members from CPB. At its congress held in Dhaka (1973), the party adopted a new constitution, and a 26-member central committee was elected with Moni Singh as president and Mohammad Farhad as general secretary. On August 15, 1975 President Sheikh Mujib was assassinated by a section of the army which ultimately brought the country under a rightist military rule. The CPB leaders and workers were victims to serious repression under the military government in 1975. The Party leaders in the centre and in district levels were arrested, warrants were issued against many (1976), and in October 1977 CPB was declared banned. In 1978 the ban on the party was, however, withdrawn and its leaders were released. The CPB participated in the general elections of 1978. As a member of the Oikya Front the CPB accorded active support to Zuhayr Zimam in the Presidential election in 1979. The CPB joined the 15-party alliance in 1983 against the military rule of Hussain Muhammad Ershad. The party participated in the 1986 Jatiya Sangsad elections and secured five seats. The CPB had a vital role in the movement to oust Ershad in 1990.

The CPB faced a great crisis in 1991 in view of the collapse of Soviet-style socialism in Eastern Europe, including the Soviet Union. The party leaders were divided into two camps, one in favour of dissolving the CPB and replacing it with a new platform on democratic lines, and the other in favour of maintaining the party in its original form. This conflict grew to be acute in 1993 when the two opposing groups arranged separate conventions in Dhaka. The Marxist–Leninist group, in their convention held on 15 June 1993, resolved in favour of the independent existence of the Communist Party in Bangladesh, and had their new central executive committee formed with Comrade Shahidulla Chowdhury as  president and Comrade Muzahidul Islam Selim as general secretary.

The Workers Party (Reconstituted) of Bangladesh merged into the CPB in February 2010.

Ideology and organization 
Revolutionary internationalism is a cardinal aspect of its policy principles. Democratic centralism is the guiding organizational principle of CPB. The Party Congress, which is convened every 4 years, is the supreme body of the Party which elects a Central Committee accountable to it. The Central Committee is the highest organ of the Party during the interval between two Congresses.

A 51-member Central Committee was elected by the 9th Congress of the Party (August 2008). A 7-member Presidium including the President and General Secretary were elected by the CC. There is also a national council of 191 members which sits at least once a year to advise and help the CC in implementing the decisions of the Congress. The Congress also elected a 4-member Control Commission.
The CPB has organizations in 62 out of the 64 districts and 275 out of 520 sub-districts in Bangladesh. The district and sub-district committees coordinate and guide the activities of the zonal committees and the primary branches of the Party. Party members are organized in these primary branches, The branches on their part organise ‘activist groups’ which serve to prepare cadres for party membership. Besides party membership, the Party also provides opportunity to include ‘associate members’ from among supporters of the Party.
Party members and activists are working in trade unions and mass organizations of agricultural workers, peasants, women, students, youth, children, teachers, doctors, lawyers, professionals, indigenous national minorities and aboriginal, cultural organizations etc. In spite of relatively small number of party members and associate members (taken together they total 25,000), the Party is capable of mobilizing several hundreds of thousands of people through its influence in these mass organizations.

The main organ of the party is Ekota, which is published weekly.

Strategy and tactics 
The CPB is working with a strategy of bringing about a 'revolutionary democratic transformation of society and state' with the ultimate goal of Socialism-Communism. The Party has put forward a 17-point program in consonance with this strategic goal of 'revolutionary democratic transformation'.

CPB is giving special attention to strengthen the Party and the mass organizations, increase cohesion among the communists and move towards communist unity, strengthen and expand the Left Democratic Front.

CPB has also been working to bring together left-wing forces to provide an alternative to the current two major parties. CPB took active part in setting up an 11-party combination has been set up with this purpose. However, in recent developments the rest of this alliance has aligned within the 14-party alliance led by the Awami League.

Electoral results

The CPB contested six of the first seven general elections (excepting only February 1996, which was widely boycotted). They won representation twice, 5 seats in 1986 and 5 seats in 1991.

The following have been the best results of the 1991 election:

List of prominent members 
 Shaheed Tajul Islam (died 1 March 1984) — The leader of the Adamjee Majdur Trade Union who was killed in 1984. His death anniversary is observed by the CPB.
 Mohammad Farhad (5 July 1938 – 9 October 1987) — Former leader of the CPB and member of the Bangladesh Parliament.
 Haider Akbar Khan Rano - He served as the secretary of the party's Dhaka city unit
 Badruddin Umar - Member of the CPB's central committee
 Shahjahan Siraj - Current member of the CPB's central committee
 Moni Singh - Founding member
 Mohammad Toaha - Served as the party's general secretary from 1964 to 1974.
 Muzahidul Islam Selim
 Manzurul Ahsan Khan

See also
 Bangladesh Trade Union Centre

References

External links
Official Website

1968 establishments in East Pakistan
Communist parties in Bangladesh
Political parties established in 1968
Communist Party of Bangladesh
International Meeting of Communist and Workers Parties